North China University of Science and Technology is a university in Tangshan City, Hebei Province, People's Republic of China. North China University of Science and Technology is one of the key universities of Hebei Province, China.  It is a comprehensive university taking engineering and medicine as the backbone and pursuing a harmonious development of engineering, medicine, sciences, economics, management, law and humanities. Education programs are provided for bachelors, masters, doctors, and adult students. Its education is offered to both domestic and international applicants.

North China University of Science and Technology was co-established by Hebei Polytechnic University and North China Coal Medical College under the approval of the Ministry of Education in May 2010. Substantially the two universities are combined into one. Hebei Polytechnic University was founded by Hebei Province and the Ministry of Coal Industry in 1958 and was named Tangshan Institute of Mining and Metallurgy. It was composed of some departments of Tangshan Railway College and the Department of Mining and Metallurgy of Tianjin University whose origin was the Department of Mining of Peiyang University founded in 1895 as the first educational institution of higher learning in China. Since its founding, the university successively changed its name to Hebei Institute of Mining and Metallurgy, Tangshan Institute of Science and Technology, and Hebei Institute of Technology. In May 2004, it was approved by the Ministry of Education for its full university status and changed its name to Hebei Polytechnic University. North China Coal Medical College traces its history back to Kailuan Vocational School of Nursing founded in 1926.  With its development the college changed its name successively to Tangshan Coal Mine Medical College, Hebei Medical College, and the current name North China Coal Medical College was adopted in 1984. Carrying forward the spirits of Peiyang University, Tianjin University, Tangshan Railway College and Kailuan Coal Mine, the two universities have developed rapidly and made great contributions to the development of higher education in China.  Hu Jintao, Jiang Zemin, Wen Jiabao, Zhu Rongji, Jia qinglin, Li Changchun and many other state leaders, foreign diplomats and guests have paid inspection visit to North China University of Science and Technology.

The university has 1538 teachers including 377 professors and 566 associate professors. 473 teachers hold doctoral degrees. 80 scholars are awarded honorary titles by the State, Province and Ministry of Education. 20 academicians are employed to work part-time. There are over 48,000 full-time students of different kinds, including more than 170 international students. The university has 8 campuses covering an area of 1,540,000 m2, a floor area of 1,000,000 m2. The total value of teaching and research equipment is 500 million Yuan RMB.  It possesses first-class language labs, multimedia classrooms, E-reading rooms, CAD centers, computing centers, audio-visual centers and network centers. The A level university library has a possession of 2.1 million books and journals, 2.6 million kinds of E-books, and 30 large-scale databases. The university is the publisher of 6 journals in engineering, natural sciences, social sciences and medicine. The first-class affiliated hospital with outstanding professionals and advanced facilities has passed the ISO9001 authentication.

North China University of Science and Technology started to offer master programs in 1985. From 1998 it began to cooperate with Chinese Academy of Sciences, Northeastern University, University of Science and Technology Beijing, China Medical University and so on to provide joint doctoral programs. In 2009 the University was approved as one of the Doctorate Program Construction Unit and would begin to offer doctoral programs in three years.

The university consists of 31 colleges, offering 80 undergraduate programs, 138 master programs including 4 professional degree programs and 12 masters of engineering programs. 10 specials are approved as state level characteristic specialties:  Mining Engineering, Metallurgical Engineering, Metal Materials Engineering, Clinical Medicine, Mechanical Design Manufacturing and Automation, Rehabilitation Therapeutics, Chemical Engineering and Technology, Nursing, Civil Engineering, and Preventive medicine. 12 disciplines are approved provincial key disciplines: Metallurgy, Mining Engineering, Disaster Prevention and Mitigation Engineering, Materials Processing Engineering, Materials Science, Bone Surgery, Epidemic and Vital Statistics, Industrial Economics, Linguistics and Applied Linguistics, Respiratory Medicine, Labor Health and Environment Health, Pathology and Physiology. Six key laboratories and research centers of Hebei Province are established in the university: Modern Metallurgical Technology Lab of Hebei Province, Inorganic Nonmetallic Materials Lab of Hebei Province, Earthquake Engineering Research Center of Hebei Province, Mine Developing and Safety Technology Lab of Hebei Province, Coal Mine Sanitation and Safety Lab of Hebei Province, Coal Chemical Engineering Research Center of Hebei Province. The university also possesses Mine Medicare Center Training Base of State Administration of Work Safety, Injury Research Institute of Hebei Province,  Philosophy Social Science Research Base of Hebei Province, Tangshan Scientific Development Research Institute of Chinese Academy of Sciences, Tangshan City and Countryside Integration Research Center, Tangshan Academician Workstation and 13 key labs of Tangshan City.

Quality of education is constantly paid the highest attention. In recent years the university has scored A in National Assessment for Undergraduate Education by Ministry of Education, National Assessment for English Majors, National Assessment for Education Management and National Assessment for Adult Education. 48 awards for outstanding teaching achievements have been rewarded by state and provincial authorities. Students of North China University of Science and Technology have obtained more than 800 awards in all kinds of contests, including U.S College Students Mathematic Modeling, National E-Design Contest, National English Speech Contest, etc.

Great achievements have been made in scientific research. In recent years about 60 awards at state and provincial levels have been obtained. About 142 scientific projects have been sponsored by "11th five-year Plan" for National Technology Support, "863" Program, "973" Program and National Natural Science Research Foundation.  279 patents have been authorized. Cooperating with enterprises, over 200 joint research projects have been developed. The findings of more than 600 projects have been commercialized, producing about 12 billion Yuan RMB worth of economic benefits.

The university has constantly paid high attention to international exchange and cooperation. Close links have been established between North China University of Science and Technology and more than 20 foreign universities, including University of Lincoln, Institute of Education London University, University of Leeds, University of Northumbria, University of Massachusetts Amherst, Purdue University, Colorado Technical University, California State University East Bay, Everett Community College, University of British Columbia, University of Ottawa, Hokkaido University, Tohoku University, Yamagata University, Konkuk University, Korean Maritime University, Silla University, Inha University, Yonsei University, South Australia University, University of New South Wales in Australia, the Universidade Federal de Ouro Preto, University of Miskolc, University of Pécs, Pacific State University, Tomsk State University, Tomsk Polytechnic University, Dresden University of Technology. Cooperation has been carried out in various ways, such as teacher and student exchange, joint education program, regular academic seminar, international summer school program, joint scientific research, etc.

History

North China Coal Medical University (1926-5/2010)
North China Coal Medical University (华北煤炭医学院 Huáběi méitàn yīxuéyuàn) was a university in Tangshan. At one time it was the only medical university in China. It was founded by a British surgeon in 1926.  It is now under provincial governance. 
In August 1998, it was transformed into a university co-administered by the government of Hebei province as well as the Coal Ministry, and primarily administered by the former. After decades of expansion and development, it became a multi-level, and multi-form educational and research institute.

Structure
The university had 1912 faculty and staff with 700 professors, recruiting students from all over the country. There were 11,772 undergraduates, 1,300 graduate students, and 10,000 students receiving career-education. It is composed of the main campus, the Qinghuangdao extension campus, one adult education institute, and the autonomous college Ji-Tang Institute.

It comprised 14 schools with 68 teaching and research sections. It offered 28 programs and granted medical and science degrees to students. As China's reform is deepening in the higher education system, and especially since the country joined WTO, the university has established inter-university cooperative relationships with medical universities and research institutions in many countries including the US, Japan, Germany, Austria, and Hungary. It accepted foreign students from Germany and Japan since 1991 and from Pakistan since 2007.

It had 12 affiliated hospitals, 41 teaching and practicing hospitals. It published a number of journals, including the Journal of Chinese Clinical Medicine, the Journal of North China Coal Medical University, the China Coal Industry Medicine and the Chinese Journal of Psychologic Health.

Hebei Polytechnic University (1958-5/2010)
Hebei Polytechnic University (河北理工大學 Héběi lǐgōng dàxué) was a university in Hebei which contributed to the formation of the North China University of Science and Technology in 2010.

In 1958, it was founded as the Tangshan Institute of Mining and Metallurgy by Hebei Province and the Ministry of Coal Industry. Faculty and students were drawn from the Kailuan Coal Mine Bureau, Tangshan Railway College and other institutions. In 1959 the institution incorporated faculty and students from the Department of Mining and Metallurgy of Tianjin University.

Since its founding, the university has had other names including:
Hebei Polytechnic University
Hebei Institute of Technology
Hebei Polytechnic University: from May 2004; the Ministry of Education approved a change of name.

Hebei United University (5/2010-1/2015) 
In May 2010, Hebei Polytechnic University and North China Coal Medical University formally merged to be Hebei United University.

In the same year, Hebei United University cooperated with Qian'an Municipal People's Government to build a second-level college directly under Qian'an City, Hebei Province, which cultivates high-quality application-oriented professionals for the society - Qianan College, Hebei United University. Qian'an College is established and directly managed by Hebei United University, and the graduates are uniformly issued with graduation certificates and degree certificates by the headquarter of Hebei United University.

In September 2011, it was selected into the second batch of "Excellent Engineer Education and Training Program" universities by the Ministry of Education.

In May 2013, it was selected as one of the first batch of pilot universities for the reform of the training mode for postgraduates of clinical medicine master's degree.

In June 2013, the Hebei Provincial Party Committee and the Provincial Government made a major decision to move the school as a whole to Tangshan Bay Eco-city in Caofeidian district. The new campus covers an area of 4,500 亩, with more than 1 million square meters of teaching and research and other ancillary buildings. There are 19 functional departments, 29 teaching colleges, 4 teaching auxiliary institutions and 9 directly affiliated units, and 20 affiliated and non-affiliated hospitals.

In June 2013, the signing ceremony of the agreement of Hebei Provincial People's Government and the Ministry of Emergency Management of the People's Republic of China to jointly build Hebei United University was held in Tangshan, China.

North China University of Science and Technology (NCST, 2/2015-present) 
On February 13, 2015, the Ministry of Education of the People's Republic of China replied to the People's Government of Hebei Province, approving the official renaming of Hebei United University as North China University of Technology. The Affiliated Hospital was subsequently renamed the Affiliated Hospital of North China University of Science and Technology (which was rated as the first batch of third-level A-level hospitals under the provincial new standard assessment). The former Qian'an College, Hebei United University, which was jointly built by the university, was also renamed as Qian'an College, North China University of Technology.

In 2016, the new campus of North China University of Science and Technology began to be put into use. The new campus is located in Tangshan Bay Eco-city, covering an area of 4,500 亩 and a construction area of more than 1 million square meters. The construction conditions meet the hardware standards of domestic first-class universities.

In March 2018, it was selected as the first batch of New Engineering Research and Pactice Projects by the Ministry of Education, China.

In September 2019, it was selected as a Collaborative Innovation Center Jointly built by the Hebei Province and Ministry of Education, China.

On May 14, 2022, according to the latest data released by the Basic Scientific Indicators Database, the two disciplines "Biology and Biochemistry" and "Chemistry" entered the top 1% of the ESI global ranking for the first time. So far, three disciplines have entered the top 1% of the ESI global ranking, namely clinical medicine, biology and biochemistry, and chemistry.

In December 2020, the Chinese-Foreign Language Exchange and Cooperation Center of the Ministry of Education officially approved North China University of Science and Technology as a host institution for the International Chinese Teacher Scholarship.

In April 2022, the School of Steel and Carbon Neutrality, North China University of Science and Technology was officially established.

Organization 
As of December 2020, North China University of Science and Technology consists of 30 teaching colleges, 6 teaching auxiliary institutions, and 95 undergraduate majors.

As of December 2020, North China University of Science and Technology currently has 3 first-level disciplines authorized for doctoral degrees, 27 first-level disciplines authorized for master's academic degrees, and 21 categories of professional master's degrees; metallurgical engineering is a world-class construction discipline supported by Hebei Province. Engineering, public health and preventive medicine are national first-class construction disciplines; it has 2 national-level first-class majors, 14 provincial-level first-class majors, 10 national-level characteristic majors, 18 national ministries and provincial key disciplines, 17 national ministries and commissions and provincial scientific and technological innovation platform, 1 post-doctoral research station, 12 national and provincial teaching teams; 2 national first-class professional construction sites, 14 provincial first-class professional construction sites; 5 national first-class courses, 38 There are provincial first-class courses; 12 national and provincial experimental teaching demonstration centers; 3 national excellent programs; 4 national and provincial off-campus education practice bases for college students.

Doctoral level discipline 

 Metallurgical Engineering, Engineering (World-class construction discipline)
 Mining Engineering, Engineering (National first-class construction discipline)
 Public Health and Preventive Medicine, Medicine (National first-class construction discipline)

Master's level discipline 

 47 majors (Engineering, Medicine, Science, Art et al.)

International Cooperation and exchange 
The university has been approved to set up a Sino-British intergovernmental cooperation project "Sino-British Cooperation Regional University English Teacher Training Center"; it is the Chinese organizer of the Sino-Hungarian Medical Forum; it has been approved by the Ministry of Education to cooperate with Heidelberg University of Applied Sciences, Germany to organize two Undergraduate Program named as Electrical Engineering and Automation & Mechanical Manufacturing and Automation. The university has successively established cooperative relations with more than 30 universities in more than 10 countries, including the University of Leeds in the United Kingdom, Massachusetts State University in the United States, and Tohoku University in Japan. Substantive cooperation has been carried out in the areas of joint training of students, mutual exchange of international students, mutual visits of teachers, and academic exchanges. The university actively carries out education for international students, and there are more than 300 international students. North China University of Science and Technology and the University of Pecs, Hungary jointly established the Confucius Institute of Traditional Chinese Medicine at the University of Pecs in the ancient cultural city of Pecs, Hungary.

On August 8, 2019, the Ministry of Education approved the cooperation between North China University of Science and Technology and Tomsk State University of Russia to hold a chemistry undergraduate education program

Earthquake site 
The North China University of Science and Technology Earthquake Site is one of the national key protected earthquake sites identified by the State Earthquake Administration and approved by the State Council. After 30 years of wind and rain, it still retains the original appearance of the earthquake. Since the earthquake site is the library of the Hebei Polytechnic University, the monument in front of the site is designed as the upper and lower parts of a book and an ancient castle model. It can be seen from this site that the library collapsed in an intricate manner under the impact of seismic waves. The western part of the reading hall collapsed from north to south, and the original roof collapsed and was tiled to the south road. The middle part falls vertically, the east gable collapses, and the main body remains upright. The first floor of the library was shattered by the strong earthquake waves, and now we see the original second, third and fourth floors, and the whole of the building has been displaced by 1 meter to the north-east direction.

References

External links
 
 Admission for international students
 Study in China

Universities and colleges in Hebei